Japão–Liberdade (Portuguese: Estação Japão–Liberdade) is a station on Line 1 (Blue) of the São Paulo Metro, serving the Japão section of the Liberdade district. The station opened in 1975 and receives 21,000 passengers per day. Access to the station is via Praça da Liberdade, the center of the historically Japanese-Brazilian neighborhood.

References

São Paulo Metro stations
Railway stations opened in 1975
1975 establishments in Brazil
Railway stations located underground in Brazil